Jeff Ingold is an Emmy Award winning American TV producer. He has worked on TV shows such as Ted Lasso, Scrubs, The Office, Parks and Recreation, Community, Will & Grace, Just Shoot Me!, 30 Rock, and Whiskey Cavalier.

He currently works with Bill Lawrence as the Head Producer and President of Lawrence's production company, Doozer.

Early life and education
Jeff Ingold grew up in Birmingham, Michigan and attended Seaholm High School. Ingold graduated from Princeton University with a degree in history. He received a MBA from the USC Marshall School of Business.

Personal life
Ingold resides in Los Angeles, California, with his wife, Elizabeth, and children Lucy and Teddy.

References

Year of birth missing (living people)
Living people
American entertainment industry businesspeople
Marshall School of Business alumni
Princeton University alumni
Primetime Emmy Award winners